The  is a Japanese regional development program. It began in Ōita Prefecture in 1979 when the then-governor Morihiko Hiramatsu advocated the program. Implementation started in 1980. Communities selectively produce goods with high added value. One village produces one competitive and staple product as a business to gain sales revenue to improve the standard of living for the residents of that village. Among them are shiitake, kabosu, greenhouse mikan, beef, aji, and barley shōchū. Over 300 products have been selected.

Prime Minister Thaksin Shinawatra of Thailand initiated a similar program, One Tambon One Product.

See also 
 Japanese craft
 Meibutsu
 Omiyage

External links 
Oita OVOP International Exchange Promotion Committee One Village One Product Movement (OVOP) 
Ōita Prefecture page
OVOP (One-Village One-Product) Campaign, Ministry of Economy, Trade and Industry

Economic development programs
Economic history of Japan
Economic systems
Development in Asia